Kiwitea is a village and rural community in the Manawatu District and Manawatū-Whanganui region in New Zealand's central North Island.

History

Several European farmers bought freehold land in the area in the 1870s and 1800s and began settling it. They cleared dense standing forest, laid grass, subdivided it into paddocks for sheep and cattle, and built roads.

Alexander Perry, who was born in Wellington in 1852, purchased 900 acres in 1877. He died in 1894, leaving a large laid-out homestead to his two sons.

Thomas Taylor purchased 380 acres in 1877. He was contracted to provide supplies for building a railway through the area in the 1880s and took up positions on the road board, hospital board and farmer's alliance, but did not move to the area until 1889. Taylor who was born in Staffordshire, England in 1843, educated in Wolverhampton, armed in Birmingham, mined for gold on the West Coast, managed a large butchery in Fiji, and ran a store in Turakina before raising the money to purchase the Kiwitea site.

James Barrow, who was born in Johnsonville in 1852 and had been farming with his father in Pauatahanui, purchased 300 acres in 1878.

William Morton, who was born in Yorkshire, England in 1848 and moved to Rangitikei in 1870, purchased 150 acres in 1882 and purchased another 220 acres in 1891. By 1897, he was farming about 700 sheep, 100 cattle and 20 milking cows for the local creamery, and was a member of the local council.

A school was established in the area in 1884. Schoolmaster Richard French, a native of King's County, Ireland and graduate of Trinity College, Dublin, arrived in 1886 and took over the school in 1890. A school house was built on an acre section in 1891.

In 1897, the Cyclopedia of New Zealand described Kiwitea as a "little settlement", four miles from the telegraph office in Cheltenham, and connected by daily coach trips to the nearest market town, Feilding.

The school had a roll of 40, and was "well ventilated" and "well conducted".

Mr. Foster's Store provided a daily mail service and general products. The owner was born in Devonport, England, settled in Foxton in 1874, and took over the store in 1893.

Demographics

It had a population of 1,515 at the 2018 New Zealand census, an increase of 72 people (5.0%) since the 2013 census, and an increase of 105 people (7.4%) since the 2006 census. There were 522 households. There were 777 males and 738 females, giving a sex ratio of 1.05 males per female. The median age was 40.8 years (compared with 37.4 years nationally), with 357 people (23.6%) aged under 15 years, 231 (15.2%) aged 15 to 29, 726 (47.9%) aged 30 to 64, and 198 (13.1%) aged 65 or older.

Ethnicities were 92.1% European/Pākehā, 13.1% Māori, 1.4% Pacific peoples, 1.4% Asian, and 2.4% other ethnicities (totals add to more than 100% since people could identify with multiple ethnicities).

The proportion of people born overseas was 9.1%, compared with 27.1% nationally.

Although some people objected to giving their religion, 52.7% had no religion, 38.8% were Christian, 0.2% were Buddhist and 1.0% had other religions.

Of those at least 15 years old, 189 (16.3%) people had a bachelor or higher degree, and 237 (20.5%) people had no formal qualifications. The median income was $31,900, compared with $31,800 nationally. The employment status of those at least 15 was that 663 (57.3%) people were employed full-time, 207 (17.9%) were part-time, and 27 (2.3%) were unemployed.

Education

The school tripled its roll between 2017 and 2019. This bucked a long-term trend: three of the seven local had closed between 2014 and 2019.

As of 2019, students from Feilding made up a quarter of the school's roll, with many parents preferring the open country atmosphere.

The annual Lamb and Calf Day is a long tradition at Kiwitea School, featuring lamb, calf and vegetable sculpting competitions. In recent years it has been expanded into a Pet Day, allowing students to bring other pets including cats and dogs
 to school.

References

Populated places in Manawatū-Whanganui
Manawatu District